Pico da Cruz is a settlement in the northeastern part of the island of Santo Antão, Cape Verde. In 2010 its population was 138. It is situated 6 km southwest of Pombas and 10 km northeast of the island capital Porto Novo. Its elevation is about 1,400 meters. The village is named after the nearby mountain Pico da Cruz. It lies in the Cova-Paul-Ribeira da Torre Natural Park.

See also
List of villages and settlements in Cape Verde

References

Villages and settlements in Santo Antão, Cape Verde
Cova-Paul-Ribeira da Torre Natural Park
Paul, Cape Verde